Elaeagia is a genus of flowering plants in the family Rubiaceae. The genus is found from Mexico to tropical America.

Species 

Elaeagia alterniramosa Steyerm.
Elaeagia arborea D.A.Simpson
Elaeagia asperula Standl. ex Steyerm.
Elaeagia auriculata Hemsl.
Elaeagia barbata Steyerm.
Elaeagia chiriquina C.M.Taylor
Elaeagia cuatrecasasii Steyerm.
Elaeagia cubensis Britton
Elaeagia ecuadorensis Steyerm.
Elaeagia glossostipula C.M.Taylor
Elaeagia grandis (Rusby) Rusby
Elaeagia karstenii Standl.
Elaeagia laxiflora Standl. & Steyerm.
Elaeagia magniflora Steyerm.
Elaeagia maguirei Standl.
Elaeagia mariae Wedd.
Elaeagia microcarpa Steyerm.
Elaeagia mollis Rusby
Elaeagia multinervia Steyerm.
Elaeagia myriantha (Standl.) C.M.Taylor
Elaeagia nitidifolia Dwyer
Elaeagia obovata Rusby
Elaeagia pastoensis L.E.Mora
Elaeagia ruizteranii Steyerm.
Elaeagia utilis (Goudot) Wedd.

References

External links 
 Elaeagia in the World Checklist of Rubiaceae

Rubiaceae genera
Dialypetalantheae